Monster Bash is a 1993 video game for MS-DOS.

Moster Bash may also refer to:
Monster Bash (pinball), pinball machine
Monster Bash, 1982 Sega arcade game that inspired Ghost House
Monster Bash, celebration originated in baseball by the Bash Brothers that also inspired a song of the same name

See also
Monster Mash (disambiguation)